Skillman is an unincorporated community and census-designated place (CDP) located within Montgomery Township, in Somerset County, New Jersey, United States. As of the 2010 United States Census, the CDP's population was 242.

The area is served as United States Postal Service ZIP Code 08558.  However, the Skillman postal address covers an area significantly larger than the Skillman CDP.  The Skillman postal address services approximately half of the 32 square miles and approximately 23,000 residents comprising Montgomery Township.  The small CDP designated as Skillman and the much larger area known as Skillman based on the post office delivery area (which encompasses the Skillman CDP), should not be confused.

The Skillman postal area is home to Johnson & Johnson's Consumer Products division and Bloomberg L.P. Financial's offices.

All of the public school buildings (elementary, middle and high schools) for Montgomery Township are located in the Skillman postal area.

History 
Skillman is named after the Skillman family. The first Skillmans were Dutch, but lived in England before moving to Brooklyn in 1664, according to family accounts. That purchase was the Skillman family's entry into Montgomery. The Skillman area got its name when the railroads arrived in the 1870s, according to the Skillman family. Joseph A. Skillman, was a teamster who owned "wild Missouri mules," according to family accounts. When railroad workers were trying to lay tracks, their horses got bogged down in thick, clay mud, and Joseph A. Skillman came to the rescue with his mules. Railroad officials also socialized at the home of another Skillman nearby, and the new train station was named for the family. A post office opened in the station and a small village, with a hay press, feed store and hardware store, sprouted around it. It took the Skillman name, too. (While the train station is gone, remnants of the village still exist at the spot where Camp Meeting Avenue and Skillman Road meet. A clay and sculpting supply business occupies some of the buildings.) Also in Skillman was the sprawling New Jersey State Village for Epileptics, a  complex opened around 1900 that had its own dairy, laundry, and movie theater. Visitors would arrive by train. Skillman was a busy little country place. There were 1,637 residents in Montgomery in 1910, compared with more than 23,000 now, according to Census data. The community now has more traffic, fewer farms and more houses (specifically developments).

In 2011, Montgomery Township sold what remained of the North Princeton Developmental Center (also known as Skillman Village) to Somerset County in order for the village to be demolished.

Geography

According to the United States Census Bureau, the CDP had a total area of 1.476 square miles (3.824 km2), including 1.466 square miles (3.798 km2) of land and 0.010 square miles (0.026 km2) of water (0.69%).

Demographics

Census 2010

Notable people

People who were born in, residents of, or otherwise closely associated with Skillman include:
 Sara Josephine Baker (1873–1945), pioneering physician; resident of Trevenna Farm with Wylie.
 Yvonne Brill (1924–2013), rocket scientist.
 Ira Black (1941–2006), neuroscientist and stem cell researcher who served as the first director of the Stem Cell Institute of New Jersey.
 John Sheridan (1942–2014), Former New Jersey Transportation Commissioner and head of Cooper Health System; lived in Skillman along with his wife at the time of their controversial deaths.
 I. A. R. Wylie (1885–1959), popular writer; resident of Trevenna Farm with Baker.

References

Census-designated places in Somerset County, New Jersey
Montgomery Township, New Jersey
1729 establishments in New Jersey